The Malvern Hills Act 1995 is an Act of the Parliament of the United Kingdom that governs the use of the geographical area known as the Malvern Hills located at and near the town of Malvern, Worcestershire, England. It is primarily intended to enact  measures to maintain the ecology and environment of the area in the 21st Century and also includes clauses concerning the building  known as St  Ann's Well and the provision of other refreshment facilities.

Background
The Beacon cafe, a café that had existed on the summit of Worcestershire Beacon for many decades, was destroyed by fire in 1989. The Conservators had plans to replace the building but were advised that they risked prosecution for rebuilding as the original cafe building was an encroachment on common land. The Malvern Hills Bill was in preparation to modernise some of the clauses in previous acts a clause was inserted to gain authority to rebuild the cafe. Five members of the House of Lords Select Committee visited the Malvern Hills and decided that there were enough facilities in the immediate area and that St Ann's Well cafe should be enough provision on the hills, so the application to rebuild was turned down. The cost of implementing the 1995 Act was approximately £250,000.

Overview
The 1995 Act gave the Malvern Hills Conservators further powers to:

 Purchase or lease buildings off their land and refurbish them for use as offices, information centres and residential accommodation for employees;
 Dispose of land by sale, exchange or letting;
 Increase the number of refreshment stalls permitted on their land from three to six;
 Set aside money from their general fund to create a fund to purchase further land;
 Grant easements;
 Impose fines under the Byelaws;
 Restrict public access to their land, in consultation with other bodies, for a reasonable period to protect ancient monuments, sites of natural beauty, trees and flora and fauna and in the interests of public safety;
 Regulate horse riding;
 Remove placards, abandoned machinery and vehicles and to dispose of them after a specified period;
 Permit temporary lavatories for special events.

See also

Malvern Hills Conservators

References

External links
Malvern Hills Conservators
Malvern Hills Act 1995 c. iii
Malvern Hills Bill Hansard, 8 March 1993
Malvern Hills Bill Hansard, 15 February 1994
Malvern Hills Conservators National Archive

United Kingdom Acts of Parliament 1995
Common land in the United Kingdom
Malvern Hills